Globo Loco was a British game show that aired on ITV from 16 May 2003 to 5 August 2004, hosted by Stephen Mulhern.

Format
The show featured two teams of children, boys and girls, who tried to predict the outcome of often crazy challenges, each. If their prediction was closest they each won a prize. After all of the challenges, the team that predicted the most correctly would go into the final round. In the first season, the second-final game was 'Custard' where both teams challenge themselves to see if they can find out which bowl of custard is the trick custard (It feels like custard, smells like custard and taste like custard but it's not actually custard at all. Dad's hint) by whacking every bowl they choose with a sledgehammer (It's made of foam rubber for safety reasons.) and whoever finds the only bowl with the real custard's team get to play the final round (The trick custard is solid and never splatter but the real custard is liquidy and splatters VERY easily.) and in the first season, the final game was 'Couch Potatoes' where the team were sat on a sofa, which was spinning by 2 crewmen and they had to throw potatoes at television screens and smash them. In the second season, the final round was changed to 'The Memory Game'. The team had to try to predict how many items someone, a celebrity or a grown-up, would remember correctly.

Transmissions

External links

2003 British television series debuts
2004 British television series endings
2000s British children's television series
2000s British game shows
English-language television shows
ITV children's television shows
ITV game shows